The Hadith of Persian Men refers to a Hadith, an Islamic "report", "account," or "narrative" about the people of Iran (Persia).

Definition
The central Hadith of Persian Men is understood to concern three concepts: Iman (faith), Deen (Religion) and Ilm (knowledge).

Context
The Hadith of Persian Men has been narrated in different hadith compilations, including the following:

Bukhari's Sahih 
Muhammad al-Bukhari provided the hadith:

Directly following this, is the hadith:

Muslim's Sahih 
Ibn al-Hajjaj narrates this hadith in the chapter: "The merits of the people of Persia":

Then follows the consequent hadith:

Terminology

Ath-Thuraiya
The term: "Ath-Thuraiya" is used in this Hadith uniquely. The term is believed to convey an exaggerated expression of remoteness.

Persia
The contextual meaning of "Persia/Iran" may be interpreted by contemporary readers as modern Iran; however, a complete comprehension of the Hadith requires an understanding of the Hadith historicity context and definitions of its terminology regarding what was meant by "Persia". Possibilities include:
 Persian speakers – Some scholars believe that the word "Persia" does not refer to a physical origin; rather, it is attributed to those whose mother tongue is Persian.
 Shiraz or Persepolis and its surroundings

References
Wikipedia Contributors, «Hadith of Persian Men». from Persian Wikipedia. (Retrieved July 24, 2016) 

Hadith
Medieval history of Iran